The Blonde in the Blue Movie (also known as No One Will Notice You're Naked and The Viking Who Came from the South) is a 1971 Italian comedy film directed by Steno.

Cast 
 Lando Buzzanca: Rosario Trapanese
 Pamela Tiffin: Karen
 Gigi Ballista: Silvio Borelon
 Renzo Marignano: Gustav Larsen
 Rita Forzano: Ilse 
 Ferdy Mayne: Professor Grutekoor
 Steffen Zacharias: Bosen  
 Dominique Boschero: Priscilla 
 Elizabeth Turner: Eva Gret
 Victoria Zinny: Luisa   
 Nino Terzo:Man at sexy-shop

See also
 List of Italian films of 1971

References

External links

1971 films
Italian comedy films
1971 comedy films
Films directed by Stefano Vanzina
Films scored by Armando Trovajoli
Adultery in films
Films about pornography
Films set in Copenhagen
1970s Italian-language films
1970s Italian films